Justin Sandy is a former (NFL) safety. He was signed by the Tennessee Titans as an undrafted free agent in 2004 then went on to sign with the Cleveland Browns in 2006. As a student-athlete he attended the University of Northern Iowa voted "Best Colleges 2020" (U.S. News & World Report 2020).

High school career
Sandy attended Sioux City East High School (Sioux City, Iowa) totaling 58 receptions for 957 yards and 28 touchdowns. After a team-effort playoff run his senior season, Sandy was voted Iowa 4A State Player of the Year.

Student-athlete career
As an athlete, Sandy played NCAA college football at the University of Northern Iowa

Throughout his NCAA football career, Sandy was positioned on all three phases of the game: offense, defense, and special teams.

He totaled 47 games in his career, and defensively posted 192 tackles and added 7 interceptions.

He was voted All-Conference multiple seasons by the coaches of the Missouri Valley Conference and voted Most Value Player by his teammates concluding his senior season.

As a 3.0 GPA student, Sandy earned a General Studies degree with an emphasis in Business Management.

After graduating, Sandy went on to attend postgraduate programs at both Harvard University and Kellogg School of Management.

Professional career
Called an underdog, as an undrafted free agent to the Tennessee Titans in 2004, Sandy was just one of two athletes to successfully earn a Titans roster spot. He was competing with 30 other NCAA free agent players from universities all around the country.

* Worth noting, in addition to Sandy,  the speaker, philanthropist , and entrepreneur, Jarrett Payton, was the only other undrafted free agent to make the Titans roster that year. Jarrett also happens to be the son of Hall-of-Famer Walter Payton.

Tennessee Titans 
Sandy was originally signed by the Tennessee Titans as an undrafted rookie free agent on April 28, 2004.

After earning the respect of the coaches and teammates during his time on the practice squad, he was activated to the active roster and made his NFL debut at the Jacksonville Jaguars on November 21.

During the 3rd quarter of his first active NFL game, he suffered a stress fracture in his left foot while blocking an opposing player during a special teams play.

He managed to finish the game but collapsed to the ground immediately upon the conclusion and was rushed to the training room for immediate treatment.

After surgery and several months of rehabilitation on his left foot, Sandy suffered his second major career setback when he suffered the same injury on his right foot just months later.

Determined to return to the field the following season, Sandy sought second opinions.

After discussing his options with coaches and multiple doctors, Sandy opted to forgo the traditional rehabilitation for a controversial cancer treatment which was promised to expedite bone healing.

His healing time was cut in half, and he was able to return for the final preseason game of 2005 against the San Francisco 49ers.

In 2005, he played in three games

He was excited to finally return to the field of play and test his skills against noteworthy NFL players like TE Todd Heap, LB Ray Lewis, and S Ed Reed.

His first start came against the Baltimore Ravens on September 21, 2005.

During the game, Sandy shockingly re-fractured his right foot while leaping over a fullback in the backfield to tackle a Ravens running back,
thus suffering his third major injury in less than a one-year span.

He finished the season with two tackles and was unable to return to play for the remainder of the season.

Asked about his multiple injuries and setbacks, Sandy responded by saying "Tough times don't last, tough people do", quoting his admired high school football coach, Walt Fiegel

Cleveland Browns
After departing from the Titans, Sandy earned a roster position with the Cleveland Browns.

During one of best pre-seasons to date, Sandy became a starting special teams player and was in the running for a starting safety position with Cleveland
before suffering another major injury, a knee injury during a preseason game versus the Dallas Cowboys.

After two seasons with the Browns in 2006 and 2007, Sandy was forced to make a decision: keep on playing and require a total knee replacement a few years down the road or retire.

Sandy departed with the Cleveland Browns on July 21, 2008. He then went on to retire as an NFL player after a five-year career.

Relationship status 
Single

Occupation 
Investor and owner of JIT Consulting

Sandy also starred in the music video for Taylor Swift's song "Picture to Burn" from her album "Taylor Swift." Sandy played Swift's ex-boyfriend and Swift described him as 'a real life ken'

Sandy also appeared briefly in the 2009 feature film "Surrogates" by Bruce Willis.

Hobbies 
Agriculture

References

Sportspeople from Sioux City, Iowa
American football safeties
Northern Iowa Panthers football players
Tennessee Titans players
Frankfurt Galaxy players
Cleveland Browns players
People from Wayne, Nebraska